In enzymology, a theobromine synthase is an enzyme that catalyzes the chemical reaction

S-adenosyl-L-methionine + 7-methylxanthine  S-adenosyl-L-homocysteine + 3,7-dimethylxanthine

Thus, the two substrates of this enzyme are S-adenosyl methionine and 7-methylxanthine, whereas its two products are S-adenosylhomocysteine and 3,7-dimethylxanthine.

This enzyme belongs to the family of transferases, specifically those transferring one-carbon group methyltransferases.  The systematic name of this enzyme class is S-adenosyl-L-methionine:7-methylxanthine N3-methyltransferase. Other names in common use include monomethylxanthine methyltransferase, MXMT, CTS1, CTS2, and S-adenosyl-L-methionine:7-methylxanthine 3-N-methyltransferase.

References

 
 
 

EC 2.1.1
Enzymes of unknown structure